The Arabana, also known as the Ngarabana, are an Aboriginal Australian people of South Australia.

Name
The older tribal autonym was Ngarabana, which may have been misheard by white settlers as Arabana, the term now generally accepted by new generations of the Ngarabana.

Language
Arabana, like Wangganguru with which it shares a 90% overlap in vocabulary, is a member of the Karnic subgroup of the Pama-Nyungan language.

Country
They were present at the Neales River to the west of Lake Eyre, and west as far as the Stuart Range; Macumba Creek. Southwards their lands extended to Coward Springs. Their terrain also took in Oodnadatta, Lora Creek and Lake Cadibarrawirracanna.

The neighbouring tribes were the Kokata to the west, with the frontier between the two marked by the scarp of the western tableland near Coober Pedy. To their east were the Wangkanguru.

Native Title 
In 2012, the National Native Title Tribunal issued a consent determination in the matter of Dodd versus the State of South Australia. The Tribunal found that the Arabana maintained strong and enduring connections to country, each other and their culture. As a result, the Arabana were granted native title for more than 68,000 square kilometers in northern South Australia. The Arabana Aboriginal Corporation is responsible for the lands today.

Mythology
Several traditional stories are well documented, especially that regarding a man-eating Buzzard and his Eaglehawk mate. The chief protagonists are three animals: (1) Wantu Wantu, the man-eating Black-breasted Buzzard; (2) Irritye or Irretye, a friendly Wedge-tailed Eagle; and (3) Kutta Kutta (variantly called Akwete Akwete) who, though described as a small hawk is actually the Spotted nightjar.

History of contact
The Arabana were interviewed at Old Peake Station and Thantyiwanparda in the nearby gidgee scrub by Walter Baldwin Spencer and Francis James Gillen over a ten-day period in August 1903 for a specific purpose. Their earlier work had argued that the truly "primitive" nature of the Arrernte was indicated by the fact that their totemic identities came from the spirit responsible for making individuals' mothers pregnant. James Frazer adopted this to buttress his theories on the development phases of "primitive societies". A Scottish amateur ethnographer Andrew Lang contested their interpretations of the Arrernte, arguing that they were not "primitive", a label he argued was more appropriate to their near neighbours the Arabana, who traced descent through the mother and linked their totemic system to exogamy. It was to address this challenge that accounted for Spencer and Gillen's return to Arabana lands.

Today, cross-cultural research collaborations are building on Arabana traditional knowledge and colonial and pastoral experiences to develop new ways of approaching modeling climate change.

Social organisation
The Arabana were divided into kin groups, whose respective territories were called wadlu.
 Jendakarangu (Coward Springs)
 Peake tribe
 Anna Creek tribe

Their moieties were named Mathari and Kararru.

Alternative names
 Arabuna, Arrabunna, Arrabonna, Arubbinna
 Arapani
 Arapina. (Iliaura pronunciation)
 Ngarabana
 Nulla
 Rabuna (an occasional Aranda pronunciation)
 Urapuna, Urabuna, Urabunna, Urroban
 Wangarabana. ([a term reflecting a word woqka /wagka meaning "speech")
 Wongkurapuna, Wangarabunna
 Yendakarangu

Source:

Some words
 kutyu. ritual assassin, kurdaitcha
 thanthani (cormorant) also the name of a totem.

Source:

Notes

Citations

Sources

Further reading

Aboriginal peoples of South Australia